Seed is the fourth album by Afro Celt Sound System, released on March 25, 2003 by Real World Records.

For this album, the band had shortened their name to Afrocelts.  They later regarded the name change as a mistake, and on subsequent albums reverted to their original name.

Track listing

 "Cyberia" – 7:41
 "Seed" – 6:25
 "Nevermore" – 4:45
 "The Other Side" – 7:01
 "Ayub's Song/As You Were" – 7:31
 "Rise" – 3:06
 "Rise Above It" – 10:11
 "Deep Channel" – 6:48
 "All Remains" – 7:30
 "Green" (instrumental version of "Nevermore") – 5:57

References

2003 albums
Afro Celt Sound System albums
Real World Records albums